Dr John H.J. Bancroft (born 1936) is a physician who was Director of The Kinsey Institute for Research in Sex, Gender, and Reproduction at Indiana University from 1995 to 2004. He was a Clinical Professor of Psychiatry at Indiana University School of Medicine.

Bancroft received his B.A. in 1960 and his M.D. in 1970 from the Cambridge University. Bancroft was succeeded as Director of the Kinsey Institute in 2004 by Julia Heiman.

Bancroft was a practitioner of electroshock conversion therapy.

References

American psychiatrists
American sexologists
Indiana University faculty
Alumni of the University of Cambridge
1936 births
Living people